Gaston II may refer to:

 Gaston II, Viscount of Béarn (circa 951 – 1012)
 Gaston II, Count of Foix (1308–1343)